= Lafystiidae =

Scientific classification
- Domain: Eukaryota
- Kingdom: Animalia
- Phylum: Arthropoda
- Class: Malacostraca
- Order: Amphipoda
- Superfamily: Iphimedioidea
- Family: Lafystiidae

Synonyms
- Lafystidae; Laphystiidae

Family of crustaceans

Lafystiidae is a family of crustaceans belonging to the order Amphipoda.

Genera:

- Lafystius Krøyer, 1842
- Paralafystius Bousfield, 1987
- Protolafystius Bousfield, 1987
